WLF is an abbreviation that may stand for:

 Wu Lin Feng, a Chinese Mixed martial arts show
 West Liberty Foods, a meat processing company in Iowa
 The Williams-Landel-Ferry model for expressing the temperature dependence of liquid viscosity
 Filename extension for a 'WinBackup File Extension Library' file, for example "example.wlf"
 Filename extension for a 'Mentor Graphics ModelSim' (digital logic simulation application) file.  In this context, wlf is short for 'wave log format'
 Washington Legal Foundation
 Waist-level finder, a kind of viewfinder used in some cameras
 Swap loader vehicle ("Wechselladerfahrzeug") in German containerized firefighting equipment
 World Leagues Forum
 World Literacy Foundation
 World Lung Foundation
 Whittlesford Parkway railway station (station code)
 Viva La Figa, the meaning of the three letters on Valentino Rossi's leathers